William M. Zachacki, Sr. (July 9, 1913 – January 4, 1969) was an American politician.

Born in Chicago, Illinois, Zachacki went to Columbia Business School and worked in production during World War II. Zachacki was involved in the Democratic Party. Zachacki served in the Illinois House of Representatives from 1967 until his death in 1969.

Notes

1913 births
1969 deaths
Politicians from Chicago
Democratic Party members of the Illinois House of Representatives
20th-century American politicians